Alexander McDonald Thomson (May 20, 1822June 9, 1898) was an American journalist, historian, and Republican politician.  He served as the 19th Speaker of the Wisconsin State Assembly (1868–1870).  In historical documents, he is sometimes referred to as A. M. Thomson or A. McD. Thomson.

Biography
Thomson was born in Pittsburgh, Pennsylvania, in 1822 to immigrants from Scotland and Holland. His family moved to Ohio when he was a child. He moved to Hartford, Wisconsin, in 1848 and to Janesville, Wisconsin, in 1864. From 1870 to 1873, he was editor of the Milwaukee Sentinel. Thomson also authored A Political History of Wisconsin. He died in Milwaukee in 1898.

Political career
Thomson was speaker of the Assembly from 1868 to 1869. In addition, he was sergeant at arms of the Assembly from 1864 to 1870. He was a Republican.

Works

References

External links

Politicians from Pittsburgh
People from Hartford, Wisconsin
Politicians from Janesville, Wisconsin
Editors of Wisconsin newspapers
19th-century American newspaper editors
1822 births
1898 deaths
American male journalists
19th-century American male writers
19th-century American politicians
Journalists from Pennsylvania
Speakers of the Wisconsin State Assembly
Republican Party members of the Wisconsin State Assembly